The Women's up to 48 kg judo competition at the 2004 Summer Paralympics was held on 18 September at the Ano Liossia Olympic Hall.

The tournament bracket consisted of a single-elimination contest culminating in a gold medal match. There was also a repechage to determine the winners of the two bronze medals. The losing quarter-finalists competed in the repechage, and the two judokas who lost in the semifinals faced the winner of the opposite half of the bracket's repechage in bronze medal bouts.

The event was won by Karima Medjeded, representing .

Results
The four digits represent scores of ippon, waza-ari, yuko and koka (which was still used at the time). A letter indicates a penalty of shido, chui, keikoku or hansoku make, which (at the time) also registered a score of koka, yuko, waza-ari or ippon, respectively, to the opponent. Penalties are escalated, thus 2 shido = chui, 3 shido = keikoku, 4 shido = hansoku make, save that a penalty of hansoku make direct results in exclusion from the remainder of the competition, while if it results from escalation it does not.

Competition bracket

Repechage

References

External links
 

W48
Judo at the Summer Paralympics Women's Extra Lightweight
Paralympics W48